Ventura Raceway is a 1/5 mile, high-banked clay oval racetrack located at the Ventura County Fairgrounds in Ventura, California, United States. It is owned and operated by Jim Naylor, who is also the track announcer. In 2010 Jim was inducted into the Ventura County Sports Hall of Fame for being the oldest and only successful professional sports franchise in Ventura County history. Ventura Raceway is also home to Cory Kruseman's Sprint Car Driving School and the VRA sprint cars. Since 2016, it has served as the home of the Turkey Night Grand Prix.

A 1/2 mile dirt oval operated at the fairgrounds from July 28, 1924 through around 1927 (this track had run motorcycles from 1910 through 1923). A 1/5 mile dirt oval was used for midgets on November 11, 1934. A 1/10 mile dirt oval operated from July 4, 1978 through 1984 (this was originally used for speedway motorcycles beginning in 1969.) The 1/5 mile oval opened in 1985. A 1/5 mile dirt figure 8 was added in 2000. The track has also operated as Seaside Park Speedway.
On a weekly basis the track is home to many types of dirt track racecars including wingless sprint cars, midgets, dwarf cars, stock cars, modifieds, sport compacts, and karts.

Notes
In the 1990s and into the 2000s motocross racing was held at Ventura Raceway on motocross tracks built on the infield of the oval track by designer Jim Naylor. These races were attend by many local racers as well as professionals such as off-road champion Jim Holley, Kyle Lewis, Randy Moody, and World Champion Bobby Moore. Ventura Raceway has hosted flat track and speedway motorcycle events that attract many nationally ranked pro racers as well as past World Champions such as Greg Hancock. Frequent ranked riders include National Champion Brad Baker. Recent Grand Marshalls have included Sonny Nutter, Kenny Roberts, Bruce Penhall, Gene Romero and Reg Pridemore.

The current speedway and flat track races are announced by "Crazy Chris" Ackerman and longtime SoCal racer and announcer Joe Zipay.

Ventura Raceway is also the home track for "Fast Eddy" Castro, who lives in nearby Ojai, California. Castro has been racing professional speedway at Ventura since the 1980s and still takes to the track for every local race.

Since 2016 Ventura Raceway has been home for the Turkey Night Grand Prix, which draws professional drivers from around the world to compete in this prestigious event. Past winners for the event include Billy Boat (1997), Kyle Larson (2016 & 2019), Christopher Bell (2017 & 2018), and Logan Seavey (2021).

References

External links
 http://www.venturaraceway.com/
 http://www.vradwarfs.com/
 http://www.scrafan.com/racetracks/ventura.html

Dirt oval race tracks in the United States
Motorsport venues in California
Buildings and structures in Ventura, California
Sports venues in Ventura County, California
Speedway venues in the United States